Ostrów Wielkopolski Zachodni is a rail freight yard in the western part of Ostrów Wielkopolski, Poland.  This yard sits on the line between Łódź Kaliska and Forst. Passenger trains do not stop at this station, as it is used for freight transport to local industry, such as the local facilities of PKN Orlen.

References
Stacja Ostrów Wielkopolski Zachodni - Polska at http://fotopolska.eu/Stacja+Ostr%C3%B3w+Wielkopolski+Zachodni

Railway stations in Greater Poland Voivodeship